Inch is a civil parish in County Down, Northern Ireland. It is situated in the historic barony of Lecale Lower. It is also a townland of 561 acres.

Townlands
Inch civil parish contains the following townlands:

Annacloy
Ballygally
Ballynacraig
Ballyrenan
Dunnanelly
Finnabrogue
Inch
Magheracranmoney
Shuters Islands
Turmennan

See also
List of civil parishes of County Down

References

 
Townlands of County Down